Cyanide is a 1930 German drama film directed by Hans Tintner and starring Grete Mosheim, Nico Turoff and Claus Clausen. The film's art direction was by Franz Schroedter. The film is adapted from Friedrich Wolf's 1929 play of the same title, which addressed the issue of abortion. The film is part of the German tradition of Enlightenment films, popular during the Weimar Era. Originally made as a silent film, it had elements dialogue and sound effects added to the soundtrack. It was distributed by the German branch of the Hollywood studio Fox Film. It premiered on 23 May 1930 on the same day as Westfront 1918.

Cast
Grete Mosheim as Hete Fent
Nico Turoff as Paul
Claus Clausen as Max
Herma Ford as Frau Fent
Margarete Kupfer as Madame Heye
M. Anderson as Dr. Moeller
Paul Henckels as Dr. Meier
Louis Ralph as Hausverwalter
Paul Kemp as Kuckuck
Hermann Vallentin as Kommissar
Josefine Dora as Frau Klee
Else Heller as Frau Witt
Alexander Murski as Herr Witt

References

External links

1930 drama films
Films of the Weimar Republic
German drama films
Films set in Berlin
German films based on plays
Films about abortion
German black-and-white films
1930s German-language films
1930s German films
Films directed by Hans Tintner
Fox Film films